Alphonse Lemonnier, full name Hippolyte Alphonse Lemonnier, (20 August 1842 – 16 July 1907) was a 19th-century French journalist, novelist, chansonnier and playwright.

Biography 
Lemonnier was born in Paris, 6me arrondissement.

He made his comedian debut at the Cirque-Olympique before he became theatrical columnist for many newspapers.
The founder of the Moniteur des théâtres et des plaisirs (1869), the Parisien illustré (1867) and La Vie thermale (1867), he was the publication director of the Paris-mondain (1880-1881) and Colombine (1894-1895) periodics.

Stage manager of the Théâtre des Variétés, then successively director of the Théâtre des Délassements-Comiques, the Théâtre du Château-d'eau and the Théâtre Déjazet, he later was managing director of the Alhambra and the Comédie-Mondaine (1906) in Brussels.

His plays were presented on the most important Parisian stages of his time, including the Théâtre Déjazet, the Théâtre de la Gaîté and the Théâtre des Folies-Dramatiques.

He died in Brussels, 16 July 1907, and was buried in the Paris Batignoles cemetery on 20 July 1907.

Works 

1856: Deux vieilles gardes, operetta in 1 act, with Ferdinand de Villeneuve and Léo Delibes
1860: Adieu charmants démons !, ditty
1861: La Fête de ma femme, comedy mingled with couplets, in 1 act
1862: Risette et Jacquot, ou les Étrennes au village, pièce villageoise in 1 act
1865: Les Femmes de théâtre
1865: Les Petites comédies de l'amour, one-act play, mingled with singing, with Félix Dutertre de Véteuil
1866: Les Aventures de Rockambolle, folie-vaudeville in 3 acts
1866: L'Affaire Clément-sot, mémoires d'une accusée, one-act play, with Victor Duteuil
1866: La Déesse du bœuf gras, folie carnavalesque in 2 tableaux, with Élie Frébault
1866: La Diva Peripata !, folie-vaudeville in 1 act, with Duteuil
1866: Faut nous payer ça, grande revue parisienne in 4 acts and 12 tableaux, with Duteuil
1868: Tout Paris la verra, revue in 5 acts and 15 tableaux, with François Oswald
1869: Allons-y, revue in 4 acts and 17 tableaux
1869: Concert de l'Eldorado... Petite biographie de Madame Judic
1869: Le Bien d'autrui, opéra comique in 1 act, music by Samuel David
1869: Le Gaulois-Revue, revue of 1868 in 4 acts and 10 tableaux, with Alexandre Flan
1871: Histoire de la révolution de Paris, avec notices biographiques des membres de la Commune
1871: Une Noce en visite, parody of Une visite de noces, in 1 act
1872: Les Femmes qui font des scènes, three-act play, mingled with song, with Monselet
1873: Les Femmes qui s'amusent
1873: Aimer un homme !, ditty
1876: Quand il n'y a plus de foin..., one-act play
1877: Les Femmes des réservistes, duo comique
1878: S. G. D. G., revue of the year
1880: Les Dindons de la farce, comedy in 3 acts 1878, with Charles Monselet
1880: Paris-mondain, ronde chantée tous les soirs, par Mme Dufresny, à l'Alcazar d'hiver, with de Jallais
1882: Cinq filles à marier, play mingled with song, in 1 act
1884: Une date immortelle ! souvenir d'un grand jour, with Amédée de Jallais
1885: Une Maîtresse servante, comédie-vaudeville in 1 act, with Henri Luguet
1886: L'Année scandaleuse, revue of the year in 2 acts and 1 prologue, with Stéphen Lemonnier
1887: La Petite Francillon, little parody in 1 little prologue, 3 little acts and 2 little intermissions, with Henri Blondeau and Hector Monréal
1891: Madame la maréchale, three-act play, with Louis Péricaud
1891: Une mère d'actrice, novel, with S. Lemonnier
1892: L'Héritage de Jean Gommier, five-act play, with Louis Péricaud
1895: Les abus du théâtre ; Quelques directeurs en robe de chambre
1897: Paille d'avoine, opéra comique in 1 act
1899: Françoise les Bas-Bleus, pièce patriotique mêlée de chant, in 3 tableaux, with S. Lemonnier
1899: Fidelio, opera in 3 acts
1901: Le Premier modèle, comedy in 1 act
1902: Les Mille et un souvenirs d'un homme de théâtre
undate: Huit ans au théâtre de la République

References

Bibliography 
 Le Théâtre, revue, vol.10, partie 2, 1907, (p. 88) (obituary)
 Le Ménestrel: journal de musique, 1907, (p. 232) (obituary)
 Henry Lyonnet, Dictionnaire des comédiens français, 1911, (p. 190)
 Guy Dumur, Histoire des spectacles, 1965, (p. 1867)

19th-century French journalists
French male journalists
19th-century French novelists
French chansonniers
19th-century French dramatists and playwrights
French theatre managers and producers
1842 births
Writers from Paris
1907 deaths
19th-century French male writers